Teucrium reidii is a species of flowering plant in the family Lamiaceae, and is endemic to north-western South Australia. It is a shrub with egg-shaped leaves with blunt teeth on the edges, and white flowers arranged in spike-like groups.

Description
There are blunt teeth on the edges of the leaves and the lower surface is a lighter shade of green. Flowering occurs from August to October.

Taxonomy
Teucrium reidii was first formally described in 2008 by Hellmut R. Toelken and Darrell Dean Cunningham in the Journal of the Adelaide Botanic Gardens from specimens collected by W.S. Reid (1908–1995) on Mount Harriet in north-western South Australia on 30 September 1955.

Distribution and habitat
This germander grows between boulders at higher altitudes in a few locations in the north-west of South Australia.

References

reidii
Lamiales of Australia
Flora of South Australia
Plants described in 2008
Taxa named by Hellmut R. Toelken